A bun is a type of hairstyle in which the hair is pulled back from the face, twisted or plaited, and wrapped in a circular coil around itself, typically on top or back of the head or just above the neck. A bun can be secured with a hair tie, barrette, bobby pins, one or more hair sticks, a hairnet, or a pen or pencil. Hair may also be wrapped around a piece called a "rat". Alternatively, hair bun inserts, or sometimes rolled up socks, may also be used to create donut-shaped buns. Buns may be tightly gathered, or loose and more informal.

Double bun

The term  in Japanese can refer to any variety of bun hairstyle.

In China, the hairstyle is called . It was a commonly used hairstyle up until the early 20th century, and can still be seen today when traditional attire is used. This hairstyle differs from the odango slightly in that it is gender neutral; Chinese paintings of children have frequently depicted girls as having matching ox horns, while boys have a single bun in the back.

In the United States they are called Side Buns, also known as "Space Buns", and were a popular festival hair trend in the 1990s. Today they have become mainstream. Instead of using wild color dyes, glitter, and braids, bobby pins, hair ties, or one's own hair are used for a softer, everyday feel.

Triple bun
Star Wars: The Force Awakens had Rey debut a "triple bun" hairstyle.

Bun or top knot hairstyle in men

Men in ancient China wore their hair in a topknot bun; visual depictions of this can be seen on the terracotta soldiers. They were worn until the end of the Ming Dynasty in AD 1644, after which the Qing Dynasty government forced men to adopt the Manchu queue hairstyle (queue order).

In the west, topknots were frequently worn by "barbarian" peoples in the eyes of the Romans, such as the Goths, Vandals, and the Lombards. Later, the hairstyle survived in the pagan Scandinavian north (some believe the topknot hairstyle contains elements of Odinic cult worship) and with the eastern nomadic tribes such as the Bulgars, Cumans and Cossacks.

Historical examples of men with long hair using this style include:

Rishi knot
The rishi (sage) knot is a topknot worn by Sikhi boys and men as a religious practice, in which the hair is formed into a bun. In the Sikh tradition, a turban is then worn atop the bun. This hairstyle is also known as joora, and has been traditionally worn by Hindu mendicants.

Man bun
The man-bun is a topknot worn by long-haired men in the Western world. In London, the modern man-bun style may have begun around 2010, although David Beckham sported one earlier. The first Google Trends examples started to appear in 2013, and searches showed a steep increase through 2015. Some of the first celebrities to wear the style were George Harrison, Jared Leto, Joakim Noah, Chris Hemsworth, Leonardo DiCaprio, Scot Pollard, and Orlando Bloom. The hairstyle is also associated with Brooklyn hipsters.

See also
 List of hairstyles
 Bantu knot
 Chignon
 , the traditional Chinese coming of age ceremony, after which men ceased to trim their hair and wore it as a bun or topknot

References

External links
 
 

Hairstyles
Anime and manga terminology